Daoud Bandaly El-Issa was a Palestinian journalist. He managed the Filastin newspaper for a period of time, the newspaper which was established by his uncle Issa El-Issa in 1911, based in their hometown of Jaffa. Filastin became one of the most prominent and long running in the country at the time, was dedicated to Arab Nationalism and the cause of the Arab Orthodox in their struggle with the Greek-Orthodox Patriarchate in Jerusalem. They were passionately opposed to Zionism and Jewish immigration to Palestine.

He established the first Arab Orthodox Club in Jaffa with some of his friends on 4 September 1924. The administration of this club was in the Shuhaibar Building, Butmeh Road. Then he worked as the general manager of Filastin newspaper. He published Al-Bilad newspaper on 23 September 1951. He was later appointed general manager of the Jordanian Ad-Dustor newspaper of which he was a part owner. Daoud became a member of Jordan Press Association in 1976.

See also
Falastin newspaper

References

1903 births
1983 deaths
Eastern Orthodox Christians from Palestine
People from Jaffa
Palestinian journalists
Palestinian newspaper founders
Palestinian newspaper publishers (people)
20th-century journalists